The character Fú (Unicode U+798F) meaning "fortune" or "good luck" is represented both as a Chinese ideograph and, at times, pictorially, in one of its homophonous forms. It is often found on a figurine of the male god of the same name, one of the trio of "star gods" Fú, Lù, Shòu.

Mounted Fú are a widespread Chinese tradition associated with Chinese New Year and can be seen on the entrances of many Chinese homes worldwide.  The characters are generally printed on a square piece of paper or stitched in fabric. The practice is universal among Chinese people regardless of socioeconomic status, and dates to at least the Song Dynasty (AD 960 – 1279).

When displayed as a Chinese ideograph, Fú is often displayed upside-down on diagonal red squares. The reasoning is based on a wordplay: in nearly all varieties of Chinese, the words for "upside-down" (Pinyin: dào) and "to arrive" (Pinyin: dào) are homophonous. Therefore, the phrase an "upside-down Fú" sounds nearly identical to the phrase "Good luck arrives". Pasting the character upside-down on a door or doorpost thus translates into a wish for prosperity to descend upon a dwelling.

Another story states that posting the character upside-down originates with the family of a 19th-century prince of the Qing Dynasty. The story states that on one Chinese New Year's Eve (or Chuxi), the prince's servants played a practical joke by pasting fu characters throughout his royal dwelling. One illiterate servant inadvertently placed the characters upside-down. The prince was said to have been furious upon seeing the characters, but a quick-thinking servant humbly calmed the prince by saying that the occurrence must have been a sign of prosperity "arriving" upon his household by using the above wordplay.

Bats are the most ubiquitous of all Chinese symbols with the same symbolic meaning as the ideograph "fortune". A less common representation is bran, not only because "depictions of grain have been used throughout Chinese history to represent fecundity" but also in combination with other grains with related homophonous word-plays (for example, lì which can mean either "grain"  or "profit" ).

Usage of the character Fú in various forms of calligraphy and seal characters as papercuts or posters represents the desire that one's good luck will be expansive and come in many forms. Chinese textiles and ceramics often found transcribe this felicitous message by portraying random numbers of bats in flight, sometimes can be more than a hundred.

Since 2017, the version 10 of the Unicode Standard features a rounded version of the character in the "Enclosed Ideographic Supplement" block, at code point U+1F260 (ROUNDED SYMBOL FOR FU).

Gallery

See also
 The shou character, a Chinese character symbolizing longevity
 Double Happiness (calligraphy), another common calligraphic design symbolizing good-luck and happiness
 Homophonic puns in Mandarin Chinese, of which "Fú" upside down is one

References

Chinese culture
Chinese characters
Chinese traditions
Korean traditions
Vietnamese traditions